Zerby Derby is a Canadian preschool television series that was created by Phil McCordic. It aired on Sprout in the US. Its French version (shown on Mini TFO) is called Zoubi Doubi; the same title is used in the Spanish dub.

Plot
The series follows the adventures of anthropomorphic motor vehicles Zack, Lily, Rex and Axle as they embark on daily adventures of crossing streams, building dams and exploring meadows, approaching every potential problem with cheerful enthusiasm. No obstacle is too large for the Zerbies, thanks to their mantra "try, try again!". The vehicles are remote-controlled and also employ moving eyes for added expression. A number of episodes aired from 2013 to 2015, though regular uploads occur on the show's new YouTube Channel.

Voice cast 
 Phil McCordic - Zack, Bob the Boat, Fill the Front Loader, Rey, Jake
 Stacey DePass - Lily, Sandy the Bulldozer, Annie, Mags, Jewel
 Jason Hopley - Axle, Chase the Helicopter, Walter the Wash Truck, Spike
 Ron Pardo - Rex, Strut, (Seasons 1 & 2) Flynn the Float Plane (Season 2)
 Kirsten Alter - Fran the Ferry, Mika the Mechanic (Season 2)

Episodes

Season 1
The Big Move (August 26, 2013)
The Zerby Town Dawn (August 27, 2013)
A Better Bridge (August 28, 2013)
Best Jump Ever (August 29, 2013)
Gravel Gully (August 30, 2013)
Tunnel Dreat (September 2, 2013)
Big Rock Sandy Mountain (September 3, 2013)
Ides of Marsh (September 4, 2013)
Jump Truck (September 5, 2013)
The Bumpiest Road (September 6, 2013)
Mazy Days of Summer (September 9, 2013)
Mud Brothers (September 10, 2013)
Upstream (September 11, 2013)
Course Correction (September 12, 2013)
Driftwood Dilemma (September 13, 2013)

Season 2

Season 3

External links
 

Canadian children's adventure television series
2013 Canadian television series debuts
Canadian television series with live action and animation
Sentient toys in fiction
2010s Canadian children's television series
Television series by 9 Story Media Group
English-language television shows
Canadian television shows featuring puppetry
Canadian preschool education television series
2010s preschool education television series